천안여자고등학교 (Cheonan Girls’ High School), often referred to simply as Cheonan Yeogo in Korean, is a South Korean Public School for girls aged 15 to 18.  It was founded in 1952.

It is located in the city of Cheonan, in the province of Chungcheongnam-do, South Korea, and is about 1 hour South of Seoul.

History 
1952 – The school was founded by the Chungnam Board of Education
1974 – The school moved from its original location in Weonsong-dong to its new location in Samyeong-dong.  At its old site, it had been both a middle and a high school, however it was decided the school should split, and the two should expand separately, with the high school finding a new location.  
2002 – The School dormitory was built, designed to house approx. 200 students.  The Dorm was named JinHyang meaning “True Scent”. 
2008 – The school was renovated with the addition of several new buildings.  
2010 – Chungnam Board of Education awarded the school the title of Myeongmungo Godunghakyo, meaning Prestige School.

Location 

The school is located in the city of Cheonan in the province of Chungcheongnam-do, often called Chungnam-do for short.  Cheonan is about 1 hour south of Seoul by train, but can be accessed faster by the KTX passing through Cheonan-Asan Station.  There is also a subway line (Seoul Subway Line 1) running from Seoul to Cheonan that takes about 2 and a half hours.
The school was originally located in Wonseong-dong until 1974 when it moved to Samryeong-dong, under Mount Mamang and next to Samgeori Park on the outskirts of the city.  The location is at the foot of the mountain surrounded by farms, making the school a very fresh and natural environment for the students. The walk up the hill to the school is a notable feature for the students, who either remember the walk fondly, or otherwise.

Leadership and structure 
There are 70 full-time teaching staff at the school, approx. 8 additional teaching staff (including a Native English Teacher) and 10 support and administrative staff.
The school also has a nurse and special needs team. 

Principal –          Mrs. Lee Young Ii (English)
Vice Principal –     Mr. Ahn Yong Hwan (Biology)
Head of 3rd Grade –  Mr. Shin Oek Cheol  (Mathematics)
Head of 2nd Grade –  Jeon Pil Che (Biology)
Head of 1st Grade –  Mr. Im Jae Bong (Biology)

Prestige School Status
Due to the ongoing success of the school, the Chungnam Board of Education deemed the school a model for others, and as such awarded it with the title Myeongmungo Godunghakyo, literally translated as Prestige High School.

Class and examination schedule 

All grades take classes in periods of 50 minutes and an additional 4 classes on the 1st and 3rd Saturday of the month.  Students take both Midterm and End of Term exams, all of which count towards their final grades.

1st Grade 

Students Study a total of 16 subjects from 08:30 – 16:30 Monday to Wednesday (7 classes) and 08:30 – 15:30 on Thursday and Friday (6 classes).  
Subjects are Korean, Mathematics, English, Social Studies, Physics, Earth Sciences, Biology, Chemistry, PE, Music, Art, Ethics, Technology, Domestic Science, Geography

2nd Grade 

Students are split into 2 groups loosely classified as The Arts and The Sciences each division studying a total of 11 subjects including the core subject.  All students still study the core subjects of Mathematics, Korean, Science and English throughout their high school education.

3rd Grade
The class schedule for 3rd grade students mirrors that of the 2nd grade, however the exams structure differs as students must study for and take KSATs – College Scholastic Ability Test.

Admissions process
Students enter CGHS at 15 or 16 years old.  Students first apply for their High School of choice, after which all students sit a  province-wide test in December.  Depending on their results, the top 500 students wishing to attend the school are allowed entrance.  Students then sit an exam conducted by the school to establish their ability in English and Mathematics.

School uniform
All students must wear a school uniform, however the level of formality depends on the student's individual preference.  Only on special days must all students wear the full formal uniform. Students must not dye their hair, wear accessories, such as jewelry, or accessorize their uniforms

Summer uniform

Formal – Striped White and Blue blouse and a flared skirt.  
Casual – gray shorts and a white and blue polo-shirt (designed by the students).

Winter uniform
Formal – Royal Blue Blazer, Cardigan, Vest and Pencil Skirt and tie.  White blouse.  
Casual – Grey and blue-striped sports tracksuit embossed with the school emblem.

Academic dress
Students graduate wearing university-style robes of black, yellow and red.

Sports
Sports Day takes place on May 26 where students partake in traditional events such as running, jump rope, tug of war and hula hoop.

Gymnastics
Several students excel in gymnastics and attend national and international competitions including most recently, the Asian Games.

Shooting
The school has a dedicated Shooting Club and Team with a full-time coach and private firing range.  They won 2nd prize in the national “Michuholgi” Tournament in 2010.

Sports Day Gallery

School clubs and publications

Art Club – A club to further the talents of students looking to become artists. 
Cheonyo Karak – This is a traditional Korean music club, playing genres such as Samul-nori.  The club frequently wins prizes and practice daily in their own music room.  The club also serves as an opportunity to allow students to hear traditional Korean music performed at events such as the school festival.  
Webi Club – Singing and Dancing Club 
FEEL – School guitar club  
DOLCE – Music Club for the Violin, Viola, Cello and Double Base.  
Study Clubs – Extra curricular clubs for Maths, Business, Chinese and Earth Sciences.

Notable alumni
Park Ji Yeon – Korean Gymnast who most recently attended the 16th Asian Games.  Still a student at CGHS
Kim Hyeon Oh – A Professor at Changan University
Kim Geum Mi – Traditional Korean Singer (Pansori)
Han Jeong Ae – Politician
Jeong Jae Soon – Actress in TV dramas such as “Three Sisters”

Gallery

References

External links

 Cheonan Girls' High School Website 

Cheonan
Educational institutions established in 1952
Girls' schools in South Korea
High schools in South Korea
Schools in South Chungcheong Province
1952 establishments in South Korea